Capitol Hill High School (CHHS) is a public high school in Oklahoma City, Oklahoma. It is part of the Oklahoma City Public Schools. 

The high school has recorded a significant history with noteworthy sucess in interscholastic sports activities. Jack Van Pool played quarterback at the school and led it to a 12-0 season and state championship before becoming an Oklahoma Sooner and then joining the U.S. Army. Orville Moody was also an alumnus. 

Rockabilly singer Wanda Jackson graduated from the school. Elmer Mulhausen wrote about his experiences at the school.

U.S. News reported the student body to be 73 percent Hispanic, 11 percent African American and 10 percent white.

In 1945, its yearbook was known as 'Chieftain.'

History
Capitol Hill Junior High School was established in 1919. Capitol Hill High School opened in 1928. It was the first high school south of the North Canadian River in the city, a poorer section of town. In 2015, the school replaced its Redskins mascot with Red Wolves.

References

Public high schools in Oklahoma
Schools in Oklahoma City